Matěj Majka (born 31 January 2000) is a Czech semi-professional footballer who plays for FK Baník Sokolov as a winger. He is a product of the Sparta Prague academy and was capped by the Czech Republic at youth level.

Club career

Sparta Prague 
A winger, Majka entered the Sparta Prague academy at age 14 and progressed sufficiently to be awarded the Vlastislav Mareček Award at the 2016 FAČR Grassroots Gala. He was an unused substitute for the first team on two occasions during the 2016–17 season and appeared for the U19 team in Sparta's 2016–17 and 2017–18 UEFA Youth League campaigns. Majka departed the Stadion Letná when his contract expired in June 2018.

Brentford 
In August 2018, Majka moved to England to sign a two-year contract with the B team at Championship club Brentford on a free transfer, with the option of a further year. During his two seasons with the club, Majka made 62 B team appearances, scored five goals and was part of the squad which won the 2018–19 Middlesex Senior Cup. He was released in June 2020, when the club opted not to take up the option on his contract.

FC MAS Táborsko 
In August 2020, Majka signed a two-year contract with newly promoted Czech National League club FC MAS Táborsko on a free transfer. He made 20 appearances and scored one goal during the 2020–21 season. Majka departed the club during the 2021 off-season.

FK Baník Sokolov 
On 16 September 2021, Majka signed a contract with hometown Bohemian League A club FK Baník Sokolov. He made 15 appearances and scored one goal during a 2021–22 season in which the club narrowly avoided relegation.

International career 
Majka was capped by the Czech Republic between U15 and U19 level.

Career statistics

Honours 
Czech Republic U18

 La Manga Tournament: 2018

Brentford B

 Middlesex Senior Cup: 2018–19
FK Baník Sokolov B

 Regional Championship Karlovy Vary I.B: 2021–22

Individual

 FAČR Grassroots Gala Vlastislav Mareček Award: 2016

References

External links

Matěj Majka at fotbal.cz

Living people
Czech footballers
2000 births
Association football wingers
Czech Republic youth international footballers
AC Sparta Prague players
People from Sokolov
FC Silon Táborsko players
Czech National Football League players
Czech expatriate footballers
Czech expatriate sportspeople in England
Expatriate footballers in England
FK Baník Sokolov players
Bohemian Football League players
Sportspeople from the Karlovy Vary Region